Sea pig may refer to:

Animals
 Scotoplanes, a genus of deep-sea holothurians (sea cucumbers) commonly called sea pigs
 Sea Swine (a.k.a. Porcus Marinus), an historical name for porpoise and mythical creatures
 A local name for the dugong
 A local name for the Burmeister's porpoise
 The name of Guinea pigs in some countries
 Hawaiian flagtail, sometimes called puaʻa kai (sea pig)

Other uses
 Eilean nam Muc (sea pig), an island in Argyll, Scotland
 "The Sea Pig", an episode from the PBS series Songs For Unusual Creatures by Michael Hearst

Animal common name disambiguation pages